Too Tough to Kill is a 1935 American drama film directed by D. Ross Lederman and starring Victor Jory.

Cast
 Victor Jory as John O'Hara
 Sally O'Neil as Ann Miller
 Johnny Arthur as Willie Dent
 Robert Gleckler as Bill Anderson
 Monte Carter as Tony (miner)
 Ward Bond as Danny (dynamite foreman)
 Frank Rice as Swede Mulhauser (miner-henchman)
 Dewey Robinson as Shane (shaft foreman-henchman)
 Eddy Chandler as Joe, Mixer Operator-Henchman)
 George McKay as Nick Pollack (dynamite handler-henchman)
 Thurston Hall as Whitney (mine owner)
 Jonathan Hale as Chairman of the Board

References

External links
 

1935 films
1935 drama films
American drama films
American black-and-white films
1930s English-language films
Films directed by D. Ross Lederman
Columbia Pictures films
1930s American films